Statistics of the Primera División de México for the 1945–46 season.

Overview
It was contested by 16 teams, and Veracruz won the championship.

Teams

League standings

Results

Moves
After this season Monterrey folded.

References
Mexico - List of final tables (RSSSF)
- Mexico 1945/46 (RSSSF)

1945-46
Mex
1945–46 in Mexican football